The Union Wesley Methodist Episcopal Church Complex is a historic church and summer camp meeting facility on Powell Farm Road near Clarksville, Delaware.  The property was developed in the post-Civil War era as a summer religious camp for African Americans.  It was established around 1873, with an open tabernacle structure for religious functions, surrounded by modest cottages.  An 1890 one-room schoolhouse that was used in the education of African-American children was adapted as the camp's refectory in 1922, and in 1959 the Union Wesley Methodist Episcopal Church was built on the property.  The school building in particular is notable as one of the best-preserved late 19th-century schools for African-Americans in the state.

The complex was listed on the National Register of Historic Places in 2014.

See also
National Register of Historic Places listings in Sussex County, Delaware

References

Methodist churches in Delaware
Churches on the National Register of Historic Places in Delaware
Churches completed in 1873
19th-century Methodist church buildings in the United States
Churches in Sussex County, Delaware
National Register of Historic Places in Sussex County, Delaware
African-American history of Delaware
Campgrounds in the United States
Camp meeting grounds